Mouldi Essalhi (born 25 March 1932) is a Tunisian long-distance runner. He competed in the marathon at the 1960 Summer Olympics.

References

External links
 

1932 births
Living people
Athletes (track and field) at the 1960 Summer Olympics
Tunisian male long-distance runners
Tunisian male marathon runners
Olympic athletes of Tunisia
People from Béja Governorate
Olympic male marathon runners
20th-century Tunisian people